WKJQ may refer to:

 WKJQ (AM), a defunct radio station (1550 AM) formerly licensed to serve Parsons, Tennessee, United States
 WKJQ-FM, a radio station (97.3 FM) licensed to serve Parsons, Tennessee